Chronicles of an X-Hustler is the second album from the Christian hip hop rap artist Thi'sl. X-Hustler Music released this project on August 11, 2009.

Reception

Signaling in an 8.8 star review by Cross Rap. Cross Rap realizes, "Looking for a dose of encouragement? Here it is. House of Refuge recognizes, I was left astounded listening to this Rap album of the year Stellar award nominated release. You can't help but replay the whole 16 track CD over and over again. Chronicles of an X-Hustler features unforgettable singles, hardcore street rhythms and rhymes, thought-provoking groovy tunes, and sheer brilliance!

Tracks

References

2009 albums
Thi'sl albums
Albums produced by Gawvi